William "Chip" Shields (born 1967) is an American politician who served as a member of the Oregon State Senate from September 2009 until 2017. He had previously represented District 43 in the Oregon House of Representatives from 2004 until his appointment to replace Margaret Carter to represent Senate District 22.

Shields was elected in a 2010 special election, and reelected in 2012. He retired in 2016.

References

External links
Oregon State House - Chip Shields - official government website
Project Vote Smart - Representative Chip Shields (OR) profile
Follow the Money - Chip Shields
2006 2004 campaign contributions

1967 births
Living people
Democratic Party members of the Oregon House of Representatives
Portland State University alumni
21st-century American politicians